Ashiana Ball Club – Afghan football, basketball and volleyball club, established in 1985 as a team of workers of the city of Qunduz. In 2000 the team is in the Turkey and is called "AZ Qunduzspor." Previously, the team was called Ashiana, but recently merged team Ashiana and team sports society Afghans working in the Diaspora "Zoalqadar" into a single command "AZ Qunduzspor." In 2009, AS Kunduzspor received a new status. Sports club regained its former name Ashiana BC and now includes football, basketball, and volleyball komandu. Futbolny Club Ashiana BC is again in the UK and participates in various tournaments. team play student activists of the Afghan educational organization Ashiana, a political organization "Afghanistan Liberation Organization" (ALO) and the Communist (Maoist) Party of Afghanistan.

Managers
 Haji Shamtar

Current squad

Achievements

External links
 http://www.ashianabk.com

References

Football clubs in Afghanistan
1985 establishments in Afghanistan